Konakanchivaripalem is a small Gram panchayat in Rompicherla mandal of Guntur district in Andhra Pradesh, India.

References 

Villages in Guntur district